is a railway station on the Hankyu Kyoto Line in Takatsuki, Osaka Prefecture, Japan, operated by the private railway operator Hankyu Railway. It is numbered "HK73".

Lines
Kammaki Station is served by the Hankyu Kyoto Line.

Adjacent stations

History
It was renamed simply Kammaki Station on 16 May 1939.

Station numbering was introduced to all Hankyu stations on 21 December 2013 with this station being designated as station number HK-72.

Passenger statistics
In fiscal 2007, the station was used by an average of 12,480 passengers daily.

Surrounding area
The station is located adjacent to the Tokaido Shinkansen high-speed line between Kyoto and Shin-Osaka stations.

See also
 List of railway stations in Japan

References

External links

 Hankyu Railway station information 

Hankyu Kyoto Main Line
Railway stations in Osaka Prefecture
Railway stations in Japan opened in 1934